John Thacher Hurd (born March 6, 1949) is an American artist and the creator of children's picture books including Mama Don't Allow and Art Dog.

Biography 
Thacher Hurd was born in Burlington, Vermont, the son of children's book creators Clement Hurd and Edith Thacher Hurd. He has referred in an interview to the "wonderful aura of creativity" surrounding his father and the Vermont farm that was their home.

Margaret Wise Brown's 1949 My World is dedicated to the recently born Thacher by Brown. (The original dedication "to Hiram Hurd" was altered just before press to read "to John Thacher Hurd when he comes (he's here)".)

After attending the California College of Arts and Crafts, he turned his talents to picture books. His first book was The Old Chair, published in 1978.

In 2001, Hurd re-colored the re-issued edition of My World, by Margaret Wise Brown and Thacher's father Clement Hurd.<ref name=pw>[http://www.publishersweekly.com/978-0-06-024798-0 Review of My World.'"] Publishers Weekly (2001).</ref> In 2008, he used his father's artwork from Goodnight Moon to produce Goodnight Moon 123: A Counting Book. Hurd's work, as well as that of his father and mother, was featured at the Stamford Museum & Nature Center in the 2004 exhibition "From Goodnight Moon to Art Dog: The World of Clement, Edith and Thatcher Hurd."

In 2012, Hurd's book Zoom City inspired the name of the American technology company Zoom Video Communications.

Hurd and his wife, Olivia, live in Berkeley, California. They have two sons, Manton and Nicholas.

 Books 

 The Old Chair (Greenwillow Books, 1978)
 The Quiet Evening (Greenwillow Books, 1978)
 Hobo Dog (Scholastic, 1980)
 Axle the Freeway Cat (Harper & Row, 1981)
 Hobo Dog's Christmas Tree (Scholastic, 1983)
 Mystery on the Docks (Harper & Row, 1983)
 Hobo Dog in the Ghost Town (Scholastic, 1985)
 Mama Don't Allow (Reading Rainbow Books, 1984)
 The Pea Patch Jig (Crown, 1986)
 Blackberry Ramble (Crown, 1989)
 Tomato Soup (Crown, 1992)
 Watercolor for the Artistically Undiscovered (Klutz Press, 1992) — with John Cassidy
 Art Dog (HarperCollins, 1996)
 Santa Mouse and the Ratdeer (HarperCollins, 1998)
 Little Mouse's Birthday Cake (HarperCollins, 1992)
 Zoom City (HarperCollins, 1998)
 Cat's Pajamas (HarperFestival, 2001)
 Moo Cow Kaboom! (HarperCollins, 2003)
 Sleepy Cadillac: A Bedtime Drive (HarperCollins, 2005)
 Bad Frogs (Candlewick Press, 2009)
 The Weaver (Farrar Straus Giroux, 2010) — with Elisa Kleven
 Bongo Fishing'' (Henry Holt & Co., 2011)

References

External links

 
 
 

Living people
American children's book illustrators
American children's writers
Writers from Burlington, Vermont
1949 births
Artists from Burlington, Vermont
Artists from Berkeley, California